Supplì (Italianization of the French word ) are Italian snacks consisting of a ball of rice (generally risotto) with tomato sauce, typical of Roman cuisine. They are closely related to Sicilian arancini and croquettes. Supplì can be also prepared without tomato sauce ( "white-style supplì").

They are usually eaten with the fingers: when one is broken in two pieces, mozzarella is drawn out in a string somewhat resembling the cord connecting a telephone handset to the hook.

Now they are commonly served in most pizzerias all around Italy as an antipasto.

References

Sources

Further reading
 

Cheese dishes
Cuisine of Lazio
Italian rice dishes
Street food in Italy